K-98 is a  state highway in the U.S. state of Kansas. Entirely within Meade County, K-98's western terminus is at K-23 north of Meade, and its eastern terminus is at U.S. Route 54 (US-54) south of Fowler. With the exception of the eastern end, the highway travels through flat farmland and is a two-lane road for its entire length.

The highway that is now K-98 was designated as K-56 on July 1, 1937. In 1953, the highway was extended south to a new alignment of US-54. K-56 was redesignated as K-98 between 1956 and 1957 to avoid confusion with US-56. The highway was paved by 1957. The original K-98 was designated on July 1, 1937, and went from K-23 west to Meade State Park. On March 8, 1961, K-23 was realigned to follow the former K-98 to Meade State Lake then south over a previously unnumbered roadway to the Oklahoma border, which eliminated that K-98.

Route description
K-98's western terminus is at K-23 north of Meade. The highway begins travelling east along G Road through flat farmland, characteristic of the Great Plains. The roadway crosses an unnamed creek then begins to enter the Artesian Valley as it proceeds east. K-98 continues through farmland before reaching a crossing over Crooked Creek. Soon after, the roadway enters the city of Fowler as Tenth Avenue. Approximately  into the city the highway turns south onto Main Street. K-98 continues south as it passes by two schools, city hall and post office. The highway exits the city and reaches an at-grade crossing with a Union Pacific Railway track. K-98 then reaches its eastern terminus at US-54 roughly  later.

The Kansas Department of Transportation (KDOT) tracks the traffic levels on its highways. On K-98 in 2020, they determined that on average the traffic varied from 285 vehicles per day west of Fowler to 875 vehicles per day between Fowler and US-54. K-98 connects to the National Highway System at its eastern terminus. All but  of K-98's alignment is maintained by KDOT. The entire section within Fowler is maintained by the city.

History
The highway that is now K-98 was designated as K-56 on July 1, 1937. In a resolution passed on August 26, 1953, it was approved to build a new alignment of US-54 south of Fowler, and to extend K-56 to it. On October 20, 1953, the SHC approved bids of $24,550 (equivalent to $ in  dollars) for grading, $12,100 (equivalent to $ in  dollars) for two box bridges, $1,320 (equivalent to $ in  dollars) for seeding on the project. K-56 was redesignated as K-98 between 1956 and 1957 to avoid confusion with US-56. The highway was paved by 1957. On August 21, 1957, the SHC approved a bid of $42,460 (equivalent to $ in  dollars) for subgrade modification and an asphalt surface on K-98 from Fowler west to K-23.

The original K-98 was designated on July 1, 1937, and went from K-23 west to Meade State Park. On December 11, 1959, the Kansas and Oklahoma highway commissions held a joint meeting in Wichita. At that meeting, the Kansas Highway Commission resolved to connect K-23 with SH-23 to establish a "route number common to both states". By February 6, 1961, the roadway had been brought up to state highway standards and in a March 8, 1961 resolution, K-23 was realigned to follow the former K-98 to Meade State Lake then south over a previously unnumbered roadway to the Oklahoma border.

Major intersections

References

External links

Kansas Department of Transportation State Map
KDOT: Historic State Maps

098
Transportation in Meade County, Kansas